Castanheira de Pera, often erroneously written Castanheira de Pêra, is a municipality in the district of Leiria in Portugal. The population in 2011 was 3,191, in an area of 66.77 km².

The present Mayor is Fernando José Pires Lopes, elected by the Socialist Party. The municipal holiday is on July 4.

Parishes
Administratively, the municipality consists of 1 civil parish (freguesia):
 Castanheira de Pera e Coentral

Climate

Notable people 
 Kalidás Barreto (1932–2020) a Portuguese accountant and trade unionist; active in Castanheira de Pera where he died
 João Carvalho (born 1997) a Portuguese footballer with nearly 200 club caps, he plays for Nottingham Forest F.C.

References

External links
 Municipality official website

Towns in Portugal
Populated places in Leiria District
Municipalities of Leiria District